The Flying-V is a proposed airliner of flying wing configuration, being studied by researchers at Delft University of Technology in the Netherlands. The aircraft is designed to be highly energy-efficient over long distances.

History
The Flying-V was conceived by Justus Benad in 2014 during his thesis project at Airbus Hamburg. KLM has backed this plane. In July 2020, the scaled flight model of the Flying-V made its first test flights.

Design
The passenger cabin, cargo hold and fuel tanks are integrated into the aircraft's wing structure. Because of this unique design, the engineers claim that it will be about 20% more efficient than the Airbus A350-900. 

The proposed dimensions of the Flying-V are:

 55 meters in length
 65 meter wingspan
 17 meters tall
 314 passengers
 140000 liters of kerosene
 160 cubic meters
 Uses 20% less fuel compared to the Airbus A350-900

References

Proposed aircraft of the Netherlands